The 2008–09 SM-liiga season was the 34th season of the SM-liiga, the top level of ice hockey in Finland. 14 teams participated in the league, and JYP Jyvaskyla won the championship.

Regular season

Playoffs

Preliminary round 

 HIFK - TPS 0:2 (1:3, 1:4)
 Ilves - Pelicans 1:2 (2:3, 1:0, 2:3)

Quarterfinals

 JYP - TPS 4:2 (1:3, 2:1 P, 3:2, 1:2 P, 3:1, 4:2)
 Blues - Pelicans 4:3 (0:1, 4:3, 2:3, 4:3, 1:2 P, 7:2, 8:2)
 HPK - KalPa 2:4 (0:3, 3:1, 0:4, 1:2 P, 2:1, 2:3 P)
 Jokerit - Kärpät 1:4 (1:4, 2:3 P, 4:1, 1:6, 2:3 P)

Semifinal 

 JYP - KalPa 4:1 (3:0, 4:1, 1:2, 2:1, 4:1)
 Blues - Kärpät 2:4 (3:2 P, 2:3, 2:3 P, 4:1, 5:7, 3:4 P)

3rd place

 Blues - KalPa 1:2

Final 

 JYP - Kärpät 4:0 (2:1 P, 1:0, 2:1, 5:2)

Relegation

1st round 
 Lukko - SaiPa 0:3 (2:3 P, 2:5, 2:3 P)
 Ässät - Tappara 0:3 (4:5 P, 2:7, 2:4)

2nd round 
 Lukko - Ässät 3:1 (1:0, 1:0, 1:4, 3:1)

SM-liiga qualifier 
Sport - Ässät 3:4 (3:2, 1:3, 0:5, 2:1 P, 4:3, 2:3 P, 0:3)

External links
 SM-liiga official website

1
Finnish
Liiga seasons